The following comparison of DHCP and DHCPv6 server compares general and technical information for a number of DHCP server software programs.

General

Operating system requirement 
In this overview of operating system support for the discussed DHCP server, the following terms indicate the level of support:
 No indicates that it does not exist or was never released.
 Yes indicates that it has been officially released in a fully functional, stable version.

This compilation is not exhaustive, but rather reflects the most common platforms today.

Feature matrix

See also 
 Comparison of DNS server software

References

General

FreeRADIUS

Kea DHCP 

DHCP server software